Kleiber is a German surname. Notable people with the surname include:

Erich Kleiber (1890–1956), Austrian-German conductor, father of Carlos
Max Kleiber (1893–1976), Swiss agricultural biologist, known for Kleiber's law
Carlos Kleiber (1930–2004), Austrian conductor, son of Erich
Günther Kleiber (born 1931), German communist politician
Stanislava Brezovar or Stanislava Kleiber (1937–2003), Slovenian ballerina
Jolán Kleiber-Kontsek (born 1939), Hungarian athlete
Dávid Kleiber (born 1990), Hungarian football player

See also
Kleiber's law
Klaiber's Law

German-language surnames